Oskar Omdal (October 11, 1895 – December 23, 1927) was a lieutenant and pilot in the Royal Norwegian Navy.

Biography
He was born at Kristiansand in Vest-Agder,  Norway. He attended the  Technical School at Porsgrunn. He graduated from the Norwegian Naval Flight School (Marinens Flygeskole) at Horten in 1919. He was promoted to lieutenant in the Royal Norwegian Navy during 1922.

In 1923 with Roald Amundsen he tried to fly from Wainwright, Alaska to Spitsbergen across the North Pole, but their aircraft was damaged and they abandoned the journey. In 1925, Omdal was a mechanic on Lincoln Ellsworth and Roald Amundsen's attempted flight to the North Pole.

Disappearance

Omdal took off on December 23, 1927 from Curtiss Field on Long Island, New York  with Frances Wilson Grayson, navigator Brice Goldsborough and  engineer Frank Koehler headed for Harbor Grace in Newfoundland. This flight was in preparation for Grayson's planned crossing of the Atlantic Ocean to set the record for the first woman to cross. The twin-engine air-craft Dawn, an amphibious Sikorsky S-36,  and its crew never arrived. No trace of the plane or the four aviators was found.

Legacy
Oscar Omdal street in Stavanger and Oscar Omdal terrace in the Hamresanden district of Kristiansand are both named after him. 

In 1928, the Ontario Surveyor General named a number of lakes in the northwest of the province to honour aviators who had perished during 1927, mainly in attempting oceanic flights. These include Goldsborough Lake, Grayson Lake and Omdahl  Lake which are in close proximity to each other in the Wabakimi Provincial Park.

See also
 List of missing aircraft
 List of people who disappeared mysteriously at sea

References

Other sources
Arlov, Thor B. (2003) Svalbards historie (Trondheim: Akademisk Forlag)  
Hafsten, Bjørn/Arheim, Tor (2003) Marinens Flygevåpen 1912 – 1944 (Tankestreken forlag) 

1895 births
1920s missing person cases
1927 deaths
Aviators killed in aviation accidents or incidents in Canada
Missing aviators
Missing person cases in Canada
Norwegian aviators
Norwegian polar explorers
People from Kristiansand
People lost at sea
Royal Norwegian Navy Air Service personnel
Victims of aviation accidents or incidents in 1927